The Little Dead Diamond River is a  river in northern New Hampshire in the United States. It is a tributary of the Dead Diamond River, located in the Androscoggin River watershed of Maine and New Hampshire.

Mount Pisgah lies just to the north of the headwaters. The river flows east into the Atkinson and Gilmanton Academy Grant, where it is joined by its west branch. The river then enters the Dartmouth College Grant and is joined by its south branch. The Little Dead Diamond then turns north, reenters the Atkinson and Gilmanton Grant, and joins the Dead Diamond River near the rapids and old logging camp known as Hell Gate.

See also

List of rivers of New Hampshire

References

Rivers of New Hampshire
Rivers of Coös County, New Hampshire